Omenuke Mfulu  (born 20 March 1994) is a Congolese professional footballer who plays as a midfielder for Spanish club UD Las Palmas.

Club career
Mfulu moved to Reims from Lille OSC in the summer of 2013, and did enough with the reserve team to earn a three-year professional contract with the Ligue 1 club the following January. He made his professional debut as a substitute in a 0–0 draw with OGC Nice on 22 November 2014. His full debut came on 16 May 2015 in a 1–0 victory over Rennes.

After four years with Reims, Mfulu signed for Red Star in Championnat National on 5 August 2017. On 17 June 2019, he moved to Spain and signed for Elche CF.

On 2 August 2021, Mfulu signed a two-year contract with UD Las Palmas.

International career
Born in France, Mfulu is of Congolese descent. On 9 October 2020, he represented the DR Congo national team in a friendly 3–0 loss to Burkina Faso.

Career statistics

Club

International

References

External links
 
 

1994 births
Living people
People from Poissy
French sportspeople of Democratic Republic of the Congo descent
Democratic Republic of the Congo footballers
French footballers
Association football defenders
Ligue 1 players
Ligue 2 players
Championnat National players
Championnat National 2 players
Championnat National 3 players
Lille OSC players
Stade de Reims players
Red Star F.C. players
La Liga players
Segunda División players
Elche CF players
UD Las Palmas players
Democratic Republic of the Congo expatriate footballers
Expatriate footballers in Spain
Democratic Republic of the Congo expatriate sportspeople in Spain
Democratic Republic of the Congo under-20 international footballers
Democratic Republic of the Congo international footballers
Black French sportspeople